Crankshaft is a comic strip about a character by the same name — an elderly, curmudgeonly school bus driver —which debuted on June 8, 1987.  Written by Tom Batiuk and drawn by Dan Davis, Crankshaft is a spin-off from Batiuk’s comic strip Funky Winkerbean.  Prior to April 2, 2017, the strip was drawn by Chuck Ayers.

Characters and setting
 Ed (Edward Roger Dale) Crankshaft Sr. is a widower with two daughters and a son (Eddie) who died as an infant. Crankshaft is a World War II veteran who, in his youth, was an aspiring baseball player who never made it to the major leagues (he played for the Toledo Mud Hens at his highest level) due to the conniving of another team member. He drives a school bus for a living and is part of the company bowling team (though he is not a great bowler). He often acts irritable, angry, upset or grumpy to cover up the fact that he actually does have a soft, sweet side.
 Pam Murdoch, Crankshaft's daughter, is a major fixture and is married to Jeff and has two children.
 Max and Mindy Murdoch are the children of Pam and Jeff and Ed's grandchildren.
 Chris, Crankshaft's other daughter, lives in New York City and only occasionally appears in the strips.
 Rocky and Bill, are bus drivers who are Crankshaft's co-workers.
 Lillian and Lucy McKenzie, neighbours to Crankshaft, are two elderly sisters who share a house (Lucy has since died).
 Morgan and Chase Lambert are a young couple who also live in the neighbourhood.
 Ralph Meckler is Crankshaft's best friend and is married to Helen. He is currently running for Mayor of Centerville.
 Lena is the manager of the bus garage where Crankshaft works. She is known for her undrinkable coffee and inedible baked cookies and brownies.
 Andy Clark and Rocky Rhodes are two of Crankshaft's co-workers. Andy is a middle-aged black man and habitually wears a green cap, while Rocky is a young white man and has a goatee.
 Lois is Crankshaft's girlfriend.
 The Roughriders were the toughest, most difficult kids in the Teddy Roosevelt High School district and frequent passengers on Crankshaft's bus. They are:
 Angel, a single mother.
 Marcus
 Shane
 Cobey
 Severo

Crankshaft is known for recurring running gags, such as:
all the bus drivers insulting the cooking efforts (especially the brownies and coffee) of Lena, a co-worker. Lena serves as the drivers' supervisor.
Crankshaft constantly trying to outrun kids (and their mothers) who miss the bus
Crankshaft's coming up with different labor-saving gadgets (which often don't work or cause more damage)
pouring too much lighter fluid on the grill, causing it to explode whenever the grill is lit
As a result, the family enjoys a friendly relationship with the Centerville Fire Department.
neighbor George Keesterman's mailbox getting destroyed on a daily basis by the school bus (although some strips have George Keesterman saving his mail box in time).
Crankshaft enjoys wild mushrooms, picks 'edible' ones and gives them to his daughter Pam to prepare. Pam always presumes they are poisonous, tosses them out and substitutes store-bought mushrooms. Ed doesn't notice the switch.
Crankshaft blowing out his back and being laid up and not caring for it (the strip finds humor in somewhat depressing situations)
The strip is famous for its flashbacks which include, but are not limited to, Crankshaft's days as a baseball player.
Crankshaft is heavily involved with the Centerville Garden Club in which the strip includes him speaking to other club members which mostly include ladies.

Continuity
The continuity of Crankshaft is as much as twenty years behind that of Funky Winkerbean; strips in both comics in August and September 2011 show a character in the latter strip, a high school teacher with a daughter of her own, as a college-age student in the former. Batiuk has tackled many serious issues in the strip, including:

Adult literacy: When Crankshaft revealed to his family that he could not read, the strip followed his efforts to learn.
Alzheimer's disease and dementia: One of Crankshaft's friends, Ralph, has a spouse who no longer recognizes him. A neighbor, Lucy McKenzie, also exhibited symptoms and moved to a nursing home.  The character died in the March 7th, 2009, strip.
Access to higher education among the poor: Crankshaft recognized that the students on his bus route would never better themselves if they did not attend college, yet they were too poor to do so. Therefore, Crankshaft sold an extensive collection of movie posters to set up a fund so they could attend college after graduation. However, he never bothered to invest the money, so the students could only attend one semester. In the June 29, 2011, strip, it is revealed that all the "roughriders" he sent to one semester of college have graduated, and since Crankshaft could not attend all their graduations, they brought the graduation to his porch.
Recent history:  The anniversary of the May 4, 1970, shooting and killing of Kent State University students by Ohio National Guard troops was commemorated through flashbacks of Pam and Jeff's involvement. It is also revealed that Crankshaft fought in the Battle of Normandy.  Chris was also present in Manhattan during the September 11, 2001 Terrorist Attack.
Rape: Crankshaft became the subject of some degree of controversy when some readers and editors thought the strip trivialized rape by saying that only young, attractive women need to fear sexual assault, implying that rape was in some sense a compliment.  It was pulled from publication in at least one paper.

Crankshaft often features flashback scenes involving Ed (or one of his friends) as a younger individual.  Between Thanksgiving and Christmas of 2005, flashback scenes were used extensively in a storyline that had Ed and several of his war buddies visiting the World War II Memorial in Washington, DC.

Daily strips commencing July 20, 2009, appear to show Ed Crankshaft in a state of grave decline, his life flashing before his eyes as he attends a Little League baseball game.  This narrative development was immediately preceded by the death of Tom Batiuk's father, Martin. It was later revealed to be a fast forward, and the strip went back to more familiar adventures the next week.  This timeline eventually came back starting in late 2017, but in the sister strip Funky Winkerbean which, because of two time skips, takes place several decades later than the Crankshaft series.  On September 9, this included this first appearance of the older and sicker Crankshaft in 8 years, showing him living in a nursing home. This story line also featured other members of the cast visibly older as well and implies a possible relationship between his granddaughter Mindy Murdoch and Funky Winkerbean regular Pete Roberts.

References

External links
Crankshaft at GoComics
Toonopedia entry

1987 comics debuts
American comics characters
American comic strips
Comics characters introduced in 1987
Comics spin-offs
Fictional bus drivers
Fictional World War II veterans
Gag-a-day comics
Male characters in comics
Ohio in fiction
Works about old age